Łokieć (Polish word for "elbow") or Lokiec may refer to:

 Łokieć, Bieszczady County, a village in southeastern Poland
 Łokieć, or Polish ell, an obsolete Polish unit of length
 Tim Lokiec (born 1977), American artist